Drake of England is a 1935 British drama film directed by Arthur B. Woods and starring Matheson Lang, Athene Seyler and Jane Baxter. It depicts the life of Francis Drake and the events leading up to the defeat of the Armada in 1588.

Plot
In 1567, Francis Drake and his cousin John Hawkins set sail from Plymouth, watched by Elizabeth Sydenham, soon to be a lady-in-waiting to Queen Elizabeth. The following year, the queen is most displeased when Drake brings news that the expedition to the West Indies has ended in disaster, a venture in which the queen's own ship, the Jesus of Lubeck, has been captured. Drake reports that their trading was successful, but then a Spanish fleet, commanded by Don Enriquez, sailed into the harbor. Despite assurances that the English would be left alone, the following day, the Spanish attacked without warning and captured the treasure the English had earned. Drake recommends they recoup their losses by seizing Spanish ships forced into Plymouth to shelter from French privateers, ships which carry King Philip II of Spain's bullion. Elizabeth enthusiastically accepts his proposal, and also does not oppose his plan to attack Nombre de Dios, where treasure from the New World is gathered to send to Spain. After the queen departs, Elizabeth Sydenham introduces herself to Drake.

Cast
 Matheson Lang as Francis Drake 
 Athene Seyler as Queen Elizabeth
 Jane Baxter as Elizabeth Sydenham 
 Henry Mollison as John Doughty
 Donald Wolfit as Thomas Doughty
 George Merritt as Tom Moone
 Amy Veness as Mother Moone
 Ben Webster as Lord Burghley 
 Sam Livesey as Sir George Sydenham
 Margaret Halstan as Lady Sydenham (credited as Margaret Halston)
 Charles Quatermaine as Parson Fletcher (as Charles Quartermaine)
 Allan Jeayes as Don Bernardino
 Gibb McLaughlin as Don Enriquez 
 Helen Haye as Lady Lennox 
 Arthur Goullet as Pedro (as Arthur Goulett)
 George Moore Marriott as Bright

Production
The film was made at Elstree Studios, as part of the boom in historical films that followed the global success of The Private Life of Henry VIII. The film was based on the play of the same title by Louis N. Parker. The art direction was by Duncan Sutherland who designed the film's sets. It was given an American release in 1936, when it was distributed by Grand National Pictures.

The film has generally been overshadowed by two slightly later releases, Fire Over England (1937) and The Sea Hawk (1940), which deal with much the same story.

Bibliography
Low, Rachael. Filmmaking in 1930s Britain. George Allen & Unwin, 1985.
Richards, Jeffrey. The Age of the Dream Palace: Cinema and Society in 1930s Britain. I.B. Tauris, 2010.
Wood, Linda. British Films, 1927–1939. British Film Institute, 1986.

References

1935 films
British biographical drama films
British historical adventure films
British adventure drama films
1930s historical adventure films
1930s adventure drama films
Films directed by Arthur B. Woods
Films shot at British International Pictures Studios
1930s English-language films
British black-and-white films
Films set in the 1580s
Films set in London
Films set in England
Films set in Spain
Cultural depictions of Francis Drake
Cultural depictions of Elizabeth I
British films based on plays
1930s biographical drama films
1935 drama films
1930s British films